Robert Rae may refer to:

 Robert Rae (cricketer) (1912–1981), English cricketer
 Robert Rae (agricultural scientist) (1894–1971), Scottish agricultural scientist
 Bob Rae (born 1948), Canadian lawyer and politician

See also
 Robert Ray (disambiguation)